Cyril Suk and Daniel Vacek were the defending champions but they competed with different partners that year, Suk with Petr Korda and Vacek with Yevgeny Kafelnikov.

Korda and Suk lost in the quarterfinals to Jonas Björkman and Jakob Hlasek.

Kafelnikov and Vacek won in the final 6–3, 6–4 against David Adams and Menno Oosting.

Seeds
Champion seeds are indicated in bold text while text in italics indicates the round in which those seeds were eliminated.

  Jonas Björkman /  Jakob Hlasek (semifinals)
  Yevgeny Kafelnikov /  Daniel Vacek (champions)
  Ellis Ferreira /  Jan Siemerink (quarterfinals)
  Libor Pimek /  Byron Talbot (quarterfinals)

Draw

References
 1996 Davidoff Swiss Indoors Doubles Draw

1996 ATP Tour
1996 Davidoff Swiss Indoors